The white-winged tapaculo (Scytalopus krabbei) is a species of bird in the family Rhinocryptidae. It was described in 2020 as one of three new species in a species complex among Scytalopus birds inhabiting the Peruvian Andes. The South American Classification Committee of the American Ornithological Society accepted it as a new species in July 2020.

Taxonomy and systematics 
It is named in honor of Niels Krabbe.

As of January 2021, the most recent version of the Clements taxonomy does not include it, but the International Ornithological Congress (IOC) does.

Distribution and habitat 
The species has been recorded from 5 localities in 3 areas of the north-central Peruvian Central Andes. It is also probably present along the eastern slope of the Andes north of Rio Huallaga. It has been recorded at elevations of  2,775 to 3,500 m, but mainly inhabits altitudes of 2,900 to 3,100 m.

It inhabits wet shrub forest and upper montane forest.

Description 
It looks very similar to other species in the genus Scytalopus, but has distinctive small white wing patches that are formed by the white outer webs of the outer 2 or 3 greater primary coverts.

Conservation 
The species is common throughout appropriate habitat in its range.

References 

Birds described in 2020
Endemic birds of Peru
Taxa named by Daniel F. Lane